2-Aminomuconic acid is an intermediate in the metabolism of tryptophan.

See also 
Muconic acid

References 

Amino acids
Dicarboxylic acids